Isostenosmylus irroratus is a species of neotropical osmylid.

References

Neuroptera
Insects described in 2016